Longwangmiao is a town in  Shan County in southwestern Shandong province, China, located  southeast of the county seat. , it has 24 villages under its administration.

See also 
 List of township-level divisions of Shandong

References 

Township-level divisions of Shandong
Shan County